The 2012–13 1. FC Kaiserslautern season was the 113th season in club history. In 2012–13 the club played in the 2. Fußball-Bundesliga, the second tier of German football. It was the club's first season back in this league, after it was relegated from the Fußball-Bundesliga in 2012. They were denied an instant return to the top flight after finishing 3rd and losing in the relegation play-offs to TSG 1899 Hoffenheim 5-2 on aggregate.

The club also took part in the 2012–13 edition of the DFB-Pokal, the German Cup, where it reached the second round being eliminated by Bundesliga side FC Bayern Munich.

Review and events
During the off-season, 1. FC Kaiserslautern hired Franco Foda as their new head coach.

Friendly matches

Competitions

2. Bundesliga

League table

Matches

Relegation play-offs

DFB-Pokal

Sources

External links
 2012–13 1. FC Kaiserslautern season at Weltfussball.de 
 2012–13 1. FC Kaiserslautern season at kicker.de 
 2012–13 1. FC Kaiserslautern season at Fussballdaten.de 

Kaiserslautern
1. FC Kaiserslautern seasons